Vatteville-la-Rue is a commune in the Seine-Maritime department in the Normandy region in northern France.

Geography
The area is popular for the hunting of boar and deer. There is also considerable sand and gravel extraction at the large quarries.

Heraldry

Population

Places of interest
 The church of St. Martin, dating from the sixteenth century.
 The chapel of St. Maur, also dating from the sixteenth century.
 Traces of several Roman villas in the forest of Brotonne.
 The ruins of a castle destroyed in 1123.
 Vestiges of the chateau of Quesney.
 A seventeenth-century windmill, in ruins.

People
 Philosopher Alain Etchegoyen (1951–2007) is buried here.

See also
Communes of the Seine-Maritime department

References

Communes of Seine-Maritime